DYES (657 AM) Radyo Pilipinas is a radio station owned and operated by Philippine Broadcasting Service. The station's studio is located in the Capitol Site, Brgy., Alang-Alang, Borongan.

References

Radio stations established in 1989
Philippine Broadcasting Service
People's Television Network
Radio stations in Eastern Samar